The Best of Cameo is the name of two albums:

The Best of Cameo (1993 album)
The Best of Cameo (2004 album)

See also
Best of Cameo